Minister for Northern Australia may refer to:

 Minister for Northern Australia (Australia), cabinet ministerial position of the Australian Government
 Minister for Northern Australia (Northern Territory) cabinet ministerial position of the Northern Territory Government